The 1996 UST Growling Tigers men's basketball team represented University of Santo Tomas in the 59th season of the University Athletic Association of the Philippines. The men's basketball tournament for the school year 1996–97 began on July 13, 1996, and the host school for the season was De La Salle University.

They defeated the De La Salle Green Archers for the third straight year in a Finals series to achieve a four-peat for the second time in 46 years after winning them from 1946 to 1949. The 1996 title brought their total championships to 17, making them the second winningest team in the league. Third-year forward Estong Ballesteros was selected to the Mythical team at the tournament's presentation of awards.

Roster

Depth chart

Roster changes

Subtractions

Additions

Schedule and results

Preseason tournaments

UAAP games

Elimination games were played in a double round-robin format. All games were aired on PTV 4 by Silverstar Sports.

Summary
The UST community had adopted the slogan “Fourward” in support of the team's quest for a record-tying four-peat immediately after the Tigers won their third straight championship the past season. Their drive was reinforced in the preseason when they won the National Seniors and the Father Martin Cup championships. Veteran coach Aric del Rosario had built this year's team around reigning MVP Chris Cantonjos, who was the last remaining player from the undefeated 1993 Growling Tigers team. He, along with Estong Ballesteros, Richard Yee, Dale Singson, Henry Ong, and Chandler Donaldson honed their skills in the off-season while playing in the Philippine Basketball League.

First round

UE Red Warriors
The Tigers lost their 43–35 eight-point lead in the second half when the Warriors began a 7–0 run. They were able to pull away after a string of turnovers by UE and basket conversions by Ballesteros off assists from Singson and Gelo Velasco yielded eight unanswered points to increase their lead at 51–42 with 5:25 remaining in the game.

The first half saw the Tigers erect a 22–11 lead, but the Warriors rallied back to bring down the deficit to six at the end of the half. Reigning MVP Chris Cantonjos led UST with 15 points and 4 rebounds.

Ateneo Blue Eagles
Ateneo pulled away with a 66–62 win after the Tigers’ big men fouled out late in the game. UST was leading, 55–54 when Cantonjos committed his fifth and final foul with 3:37 left. The score has been close until the last 2:10 when the Eagles made their move behind John Verayo's efforts, first, by converting both free throws off a Richard Melencio foul for a 61–58 lead; and then a steal off Singson that led to a fast break and a layup by teammate Gabby Cui. Melencio was able to score from under the basket to move within three at 60–63, but Ballesteros got called for his fifth foul in the last 0:43 during a rebounding tussle with Verayo.

NU Bulldogs
The Tigers defeated the NU Bulldogs, 78–59 even as they missed the services of Yee, Donaldson, and Francis Mangyao who had suffered from various injuries. The team relied on the collective rebounding of Cantonjos, Melencio, and Gerard Francisco to deny the Bulldogs from scoring second-chance points. They broke away from their nine-point 38–29 halftime lead when the quartet of Singson, Melencio, Cantonjos, and Ong orchestrated a 16–4 run to put the game out of their opponents’ reach. Melencio led in scoring with a game-high of 16 points.

UP Fighting Maroons
Hardly missing the still-injured Yee, Mangyao and Donaldson, the Tigers won against UP by a blowout lead of 26 points. The score was tied at 43–all at the 8:44 mark of the second half before Singson and Velasco each shot a three-pointer to ignite a 20–9 run for a 63–50 lead. Cantonjos finished with 24 points to go with his 13 rebounds.

Adamson Soaring Falcons
UST won their third straight game when they defeated Adamson, 80–65 behind Ballesteros’ game-high of 30 points. The Tigers led, 40–36 at the half, until Ballesteros sparked a 14–7 rally at the 12:40 mark to pull his team to 54–43.

FEU Tamaraws
With Cantonjos sitting out due to a stress fracture on his right hand, the Tigers lost against FEU, 64–67. Singson topscored for UST with 16 points.

De La Salle Green Archers
The Tigers suffered their second straight loss at the hands of La Salle by three points in a game that went into overtime. Ballesteros topscored for UST with 21 points.

Second round
UST's four wins and three losses in the first round put them in a tie at third place with Ateneo and behind La Salle and the UP Fighting Maroons’ 5–2 record.

Adamson Soaring Falcons
Injuries continued to hound the Tigers as Cantonjos and Donaldson sat out, forcing the still-recuperating Richard Yee to suit up to relieve forwards Ballesteros and rookie Mel Latoreno. The Falcons staged a late rally in the last two minutes in an effort to surmount UST's 10-point advantage, but the Tigers were able to keep them at bay until time ran out. Francisco and Ballesteros scored 19 and 18 points respectively.

NU Bulldogs
Dale Singson's endgame heroics prevented the NU Bulldogs from staging a late-game comeback. The starting point guard converted three free throws and made back-to-back steals in the last 18 seconds to give the Tigers an 11–4 scoring advantage for a 74–64 win. The team continued to miss the services of their two centers, with Donaldson being ruled out for the remainder of the season due to a slipped disc, and Cantonjos still suffering from dizziness.

FEU Tamaraws
The Tigers avenged their first-round loss to FEU with a 79–74 win, but they were still reeling from the absences of their big men. Camtonjos, who had been suffering from dizziness had to be literally plucked out from the UST Hospital to play in place of Mel Latoreno, who was part of the Philippines' U-18 team that left for the ABC tournament in Malaysia. The Tigers regrouped from a turnover-filled first half to mount a 17–9 run by Cantonjos, Ballesteros, and Yee for a 58–45 lead.

UE Red Warriors
Coach Aric del Rosario heaved a sigh of relief as the Tigers benefitted from the return to form of his two starters. Richard Yee has recovered from his bout with hepatitis, while Dale Singson's sprained left thigh has finally healed. The veteran coach was pleased with how the team was able to run and execute their plays.

Henry Ong scored 14 of his 17 points the first half with three three-point shot conversions that helped his team erect a commanding 27-point lead over UE.

UP Fighting Maroons
Dale Singson towed the Tigers to a down-to-the-wire victory for the second time in the second round since his endgame performance against the NU Bulldogs on August 28. Trailing UP at 66–71 in the last 33 seconds of the game, UST was able to pull close with free throw conversions by Yee, Cantonjos, and Ballesteros to put the game within one at 70–71. Singson was able to steal off UP's Jasper Javier and convert on a drive for the win as time expired.

De La Salle Green Archers
UST could not get their perimeter shooting going as La Salle repeated their win over the Tigers in the second round. The Archers took the solo spot at first place from being tied with UST prior to the game with identical 9–3 records. The score was tied at 54–all at the 8:57 mark in the second half when La Salle's Chris Tan made two successive baskets. The Tigers were unable to score as the Archers pulled ahead, 65–54.

Ateneo Blue Eagles
The Tigers broke free from a 75–all deadlock with a 9–4 run that started with Dale Singson's jump shot and followed by a layup by Henry Ong. Ateneo cane close to within three at 79–76 in the last 56 seconds, but UST was able to force back-to-back turnovers, the first resulting to a three-point play by Cantonjos, and then a two-point conversion to end the game at 84–79.

Final Four

UP Fighting Maroons
Holding a twice-to-beat advantage over the third-seeded UP Fighting Maroons, the Tigers came out with a 63–56 win to advance to the Finals. Coming from a 12-point halftime lead, UST relied on steady free throw shooting from Gerard Francisco to pull away after UP's Paolo Mendoza fired a three-point shot to cut down the lead to five at 59–54 in the last 40 seconds.

Finals

Even as UST is seeded second behind La Salle, and have lost both their head-to-head elimination games, analysts have tabbed them as the favorites to win the championship. The Archers’ Jong Uichico, who was coaching a collegiate team in the Finals for the first time in his career, will be relying on a group of young players who equally have no prior championship experience. Del Rosario begged to differ, citing injuries on his players during the eliminations have lowered their chances in the Finals. He motivated his players by emphasizing the opportunity to make history in the UAAP with winning a fourth consecutive title.

Game 1
The Tigers’ defense prevented La Salle from scoring at will in the last 10 minutes. In contrast, UST had a great game with their shooting, with nine of Henry Ong's 17 points coming from three-point shots. Down by five points at 44–49, they were able to execute a 12–0 run at the 5:36 mark to give their team a 56–49 lead.

Game 2
UST went scoreless for eight minutes in the first half, which ended with La Salle leading, 26–21. They began the second half with a 5–0 run behind Dale Singson's three-point shot and an eight-foot pull-up jumper on a transition fast break to tie the score. The two teams traded baskets until the Archers pulled away after Tyrone Bautista made a three-point shot to put his team ahead by nine points with six minutes left. The Tigers next scored nine unanswered points which was capped by Henry Ong's three-point shot in the last 2:23 to tie the game at 48-all.

Estong Ballesteros fouled out in the ensuing play with Bautista making both free throws. Gelo Velasco made back-to-back baskets, first a mid-range shot, and then a three-point shot off a Mark Telan miss, pulling his team ahead by one. A foul by Ong sent Bautista to the line anew, making both free throws again for a La Salle lead. Ong, in turn drove and converted with a foul from Bautista for a three-point play in the last 33 seconds. He made the bonus shot for a three-point lead. Telan missed a three-point attempt but was fouled by Cantonjos in the rebound, giving possession to La Salle. Chris Tan converted on a drive and Dino Aldeguer hurriedly fouled Ong at the inboud to stop the game clock. He split his free throws, giving the Archers a chance to tie after Don Allado collared the rebound, but Dale Singson was able to steal the ball from Bautista who was driving down the basket with 11.7 seconds left. Telan fouled him in the 9.2 mark. Singson missed both free throws as Telan got the rebound, but La Salle missed two successive three point shots by Bautista and Tan as time ran out. UST won, 57–54.

Awards

Players drafted into the PBA
Estong Ballesteros was picked fourth overall in the 1997 PBA draft by the Chito Narvasa-led Formula Shell Zoom Masters team on January 19, 1997. Chris Cantonjos, meanwhile, was one of the six players elevated by the Tanduay Centennial Rhum team to the PBA from the Philippine Basketball League in 1999.

References

UST Growling Tigers basketball team seasons
UAAP Season 59